Dick Steinberg (August 9, 1935 – September 25, 1995) was an American football executive who served as the general manager of the New York Jets from 1990 to 1994.

Career

Early career

Steinberg began his career as a coach at Roman Catholic High School before moving on to being a coach at Staunton Military Academy.

College football coaching
Steinberg was an assistant coach at Vanderbilt from 1964 to 1966. Starting in 1967 and for three seasons, Steinberg was an assistant coach at Kansas State. Steinberg's last college coaching job was when he was an assistant coach at Southern Miss.

National Football league personnel

In 1972, Steinberg became a scout for the New England Patriots which would last until after the 1976 season. 

In 1977, the Los Angeles Rams hired Steinberg. During his tenure with the Rams he drafted a core group of players who would play a part in the Rams reaching Super Bowl XIV. During the 1980 season, Steinberg was the Vice President of Player Personnel for the New Orleans Saints. In 1981, Steimberg returned to the Patriots and for nine seasons he was their director of player development. He helped build the Patriots team that would reach Super Bowl XX a few years later. In late 1989, after the Patriots reduced his role within the organization, Steinberg joined the New York Jets as their General Manager, becoming the first such person in that role for the team since the 1970s. Steinberg's most notable move during his tenure with the Jets was trading for Cincinnati Bengals quarterback Boomer Esiason in 1993.

Death

Steinberg died of stomach cancer on September 25, 1995, in Long Beach, New York at age 60.

References

1935 births
1995 deaths
Vanderbilt Commodores football coaches
Kansas State Wildcats football coaches
Southern Miss Golden Eagles football coaches
National Football League general managers
Los Angeles Rams executives
New England Patriots executives
New York Jets executives